Solko Johannes van den Bergh (4 June 1854 in The Hague – 25 December 1916 in The Hague) was a Dutch sport shooter.

Van den Bergh was a notary by profession who on 6 June 1880 married the noble Sophia Emma Nicoletta van Limburg Brouwer in Zeist. Together with his friend Henrik Sillem and the Frenchman François Monod he initiated the first "international shooting matches" (world championships in shooting) in 1897 in Lyon. These were the forerunners of the matches that were held in Paris in 1900, now considered to have been part of the Olympics. Van den Bergh participated in these and won a bronze medal with the Dutch pistol team.

References

External links

Article in Journal of Olympic History

Dutch male sport shooters
Olympic bronze medalists for the Netherlands
Olympic shooters of the Netherlands
Shooters at the 1900 Summer Olympics
1854 births
1916 deaths
Sportspeople from The Hague
Olympic medalists in shooting
Presidents of the Organising Committees for the Olympic Games
Medalists at the 1900 Summer Olympics